Mamulan District is a district (bakhsh) in Pol-e Dokhtar County, Lorestan Province, Iran. At the 2006 census, its population was 23,941, in 5,176 families.  The District has one city: Mamulan. The District has three Rural Districts (dehestans): Afrineh Rural District, Mamulan Rural District, and Miyankuh-e Sharqi Rural District.

References 

Districts of Lorestan Province
Pol-e Dokhtar County